is the Japanese manager for Sony who was credited as one of the main developers of the Walkman. While general manager of the Tape Recorder Business Division he was asked to help develop a portable audio player. Ohsone and his staff modified the existing Pressman device to create the Walkman, which was released in Japan in 1979.

References
Official Sony history - development of the Walkman

Japanese engineers
1933 births
Living people
Sony people